Double, Double, Toil and Trouble is a 1993 American Halloween made-for-television children's film. It stars Mary-Kate and Ashley Olsen as two adventurous little girls who discover that their Great Aunt Sophia has been trapped and cursed by her evil twin sister Agatha. On the 7th year of her imprisonment, Sophia will be doomed to the netherworld unless the curse is broken by the magical spell of twins. The film's title is part of the famous line spoken by the three witches in Shakespeare's Macbeth (Act IV, Scene I): "Double, double toil and trouble; Fire burn and cauldron bubble."

Plot
7-year-old Kelly (Mary-Kate Olsen) and 7-year-old Lynn Farmer's (Ashley Olsen) parents, Don (Eric McCormack) and Christine (Kelli Fox), are deeply in debt and in danger of losing their home. During the Halloween season, they visit Christine's cold and cruel Aunt Agatha (Cloris Leachman) to ask for a loan, which is immediately refused. While the girls wait outside, they meet Agatha's grave digger (Wayne Robson) who tells them the story of Agatha's twin sister Sophia (also played by Cloris Leachman) who is trapped inside the house. He explains to the girls that Agatha's home once belonged to a powerful witch who, before being burned at the stake 200 years before, had hidden her moonstone, the rare gem which gave her power. As children, Agatha and Sophia, tired of being twins, heard the tale and began looking for the stone in hopes of using its power to no longer look like each other. Agatha found the moonstone but hid it from her sister and instead began using the magic it possessed to make her sister's life miserable. Years later on Halloween, Sophia and her fiancé George (Matthew Walker), now Agatha's butler, prepared to elope and begin their life together, but Agatha, out of jealously and rage, cast a spell that banished her sister into the netherworld through a mirror, which she keeps hidden in the attic. On the 7th year at midnight, this Halloween, the spell will become permanent and there will be no way for Sophia to be rescued.

Back at home, Kelly and Lynn learn of their parents' financial problems. Christine expresses that if Aunt Sophia were still around, she would be able to help them. Knowing this, the girls begin a rescue mission to free Aunt Sophia before it is too late. The spell can only be broken by twins who have possession of the moonstone, so Kelly and Lynn's ultimate goal is to apprehend it. The only problem is, Aunt Agatha wears the gem around her neck at all times. While out trick or treating, they swap costumes with two other kids so they are able to get away from their parents. The first person they meet is a homeless man who dreams of money and stardom, Mr. N (Meshach Taylor), who offers to help the girls because they should not be on such a dangerous journey without an adult. The girls carry with them a toy magic wand that they won at a Halloween party, which actually has unexplained genuine magical powers (though it is heavily implied that the twins have the magical powers and not the wand). Kelly, Lynn and Mr. N visit a phony psychic to ask where they are able to find the witches gathering that Aunt Agatha will attend that night. Lulu is unable to answer and instead they use the wand to find the location and set off again by hitching a ride on a pumpkin truck. They get dropped off near a woods and find a small house deep inside, the home of a man named Oscar (Phil Fondacaro) who wishes to be taller. They tell him the whole story and he agrees to go along with them. Meanwhile, Don and Christine discover the girls have gone and inform the police.

Aunt Agatha overhears the girls' plan using the magic mirror and begins a plan to get rid of them. She is threatened by their presence because she knows that the power of twins combined is superior to her own. Kelly, Lynn, Mr. N and Oscar turn up at the gathering in costumes in hopes of fitting in and they oversee the events inside. Aunt Agatha reveals the story of her spell on her sister to the crowd while Mr. N and Oscar create a plan to try to get her to hand over the moonstone, which she does, intrigued by their promise to double her power. However, they are soon found out and are chased through town. They decide to split up; Lynn, who has the moonstone, with Oscar, and Kelly goes with Mr. N.

Followed by Agatha and her butler, Kelly and Mr. N run into a dead end at an abandoned warehouse. Mr. N goes out to confront Agatha, but she turns him into a crow, leaving Kelly alone. Later on, Aunt Sophia appears to Kelly, expressing that Lynn and Oscar have freed her, but Kelly realizes it is a trick and that Aunt Agatha has transformed herself to try and catch her. She manages to get away but is then gets caught by George when she flees from the building. Mr. N, as a crow, finds Lynn and Oscar to tell them what has happened (but not before puncturing one of Agatha's tires off-screen to help Lynn and Oscar buy time). Lynn starts to panic, since she and Kelly have never been apart and Kelly is probably scared all by herself. In the same part of town, Lynn finds where Mr. Gravedigger lives and goes to ask for his help in getting to Agatha’s house. On their way, the police officer looking for the girls sees them driving away. She informs Don and Christine where she saw them, and Christine realizes it is near Aunt Agatha's mansion so that is probably where they are heading.

Fifteen minutes to midnight, the group break into the house to search for the mirror. Lynn hears Aunt Sophia crying out for help in the attic and she goes to investigate. The good news is, Lynn has the moonstone, but the bad news is, Kelly is not there, and she needs both twins to free her. Minutes later, Agatha, George and Kelly arrive. Agatha tries to persuade Lynn into betraying her sister, but Lynn refuses. Still, she promises to hand over the moonstone if Agatha lets everyone go, to which Agatha agrees. Lynn places the moonstone on the floor and then Aunt Agatha breaks her end of the promise, threatening to turn everybody into animals forever. Mr. N flies down the staircase and snatches the moonstone away in his beak, while Kelly escapes from George's watch and the girls flee upstairs to free Sophia together. Oscar and Gravedigger are turned into turtles when they make their last stand towards Agatha. The twins ask Sophia what the incantation is, but Sophia reveals that it has to come from their hearts.

Aunt Agatha bursts into the room laughing, revealing that it is after midnight. Lynn and Kelly tell each other that they love each other and want to be sisters no matter what anybody else says or thinks, and Sophia is finally freed. Lynn explains she pushed the clock ahead by five minutes, so it was not too late after all. Enraged, Agatha attempts to push her sister back into the mirror, but the twins fight back and Agatha falls into the mirror herself. All of Agatha's dark magic is destroyed and the mirror is shattered, thus trapping her in the netherworld forever.

Don and Christine arrive at the mansion to find Sophia safe and happily returned. Everyone keeps what happened a secret, preferring to tell them that Agatha went on a long trip to "reflect". Kelly and Lynn thank their new friends for helping them out: Mr. Gravedigger for his courage and bravery when standing up to "you know who", Oscar for his fabulous plans and distractions, and Mr. N for being their first companion who looked out for them on the road. He tells them he has also learned that money is just money and that friends are more important. Aunt Sophia and George fall in love all over again, and redecorate the mansion so it is a second home for the whole family. She also agrees to give the Farmers the money they need to save their home.

Days later while enjoying family time in the garden, Lynn and Kelly are cleaning up the broken mirror in the attic and they see Aunt Agatha in one of the broken pieces. She asks for help, but the twins say "no chance" and walk out of the attic while holding hands and the magic wand. The movie ends with Aunt Agatha shouting, "I hate Halloween!"

Cast

Release
The movie was filmed in Vancouver, British Columbia, Canada. It debuted in the United States on October 30, 1993.

Awards and nominations
In 1994, there was an Emmy Award nomination for Outstanding Individual Achievement in Music Composition for a Miniseries or a Special (Dramatic Underscore) for composer Richard Bellis. In the same year, Mary-Kate and Ashley Olsen were also nominated and won the Young Artist Award for Best Youth Actress in a TV Mini-Series, Movie of the Week, or Special.

References

External links
 

1990s children's fantasy films
1993 films
1993 television films
1993 horror films
1993 comedy films
American supernatural horror films
Children's horror films
American fantasy comedy films
American films about Halloween
American television films
Films about curses
Films about twin sisters
Films about witchcraft
Twins in fiction
Films directed by Stuart Margolin
1990s American films